The discography of Australian electronic music producer What So Not consists of one studio album, four extended plays, 16 singles, and 21 remixes.

Studio albums

Extended plays

Singles

Other appearances

Remixes

Songwriting and production credits

References

Discographies of Australian artists
Electronic music discographies